Bernard Francis McGann (22 June 1937 – 17 September 2013) was an Australian jazz alto saxophone player. He began his career in the late 1950s and remained active as a performer, composer and recording artist until near the end of his life. McGann won four ARIA Music Awards between 1993 and 2001.

McGann led the Bernie McGann Trio and Bernie McGann Quartet through his career. The most well-known lineup of the Trio was McGann (alto sax), John Pochee (drums), Lloyd Swanton (bass), with the addition of Warwick Alder (trumpet) in the quartet.

Career
Born in Granville, in Sydney's western suburbs, McGann first came to prominence as part of a loose alliance of modern jazz musicians who performed at the El Rocco Jazz Cellar in Kings Cross, Sydney in the late 1950s and early 1960s. He had an enduring collaboration with drummer John Pochee.

During the 1960s and early 1970s, McGann also performed with rock and pop groups and as a session musician, and in the 1970s he was a member of the Sydney rock-soul band Southern Comfort. In 1974, McGann was a founding member of jazz group, The Last Straw.

Between 1980 and 1982, McGann played support to US jazz artists, including Freddie Hubbard, Lester Bowie, and Dave Liebman.

In 1983, McGann studied in New York on a grant from The Australia Council.

In 1988, McGann Toured Australia and USA with the Australian Jazz Orchestra, a special Bicentennial project. He was a featured artist in award-winning documentary film Beyond El Rocco.

In 1992, McGann won the Spiral Scratch MO Award for Bernie McGann Trio in Jazz Group of the Year.

At the ARIA Music Awards of 1993, McGann won the ARIA Award for Best Jazz Album.

In 1994, McGann won Australian Mo Awards for Jazz Instrumentalist of the Year.

In 1998, McGann won the Don Banks Music Award, the first time it has been awarded to a non-classical musician/composer. Launch of biography Bernie McGann: A Life in Jazz by Geoff Page (Kardooraire Press).

At the ARIA Music Awards of 2001, McGann won his fourth ARIA Award.

McGann died on 17 September 2013, following complications from heart surgery. He was 76.

Discography

Albums

Awards and nominations

ARIA Music Awards
The ARIA Music Awards is an annual awards ceremony that recognises excellence, innovation, and achievement across all genres of Australian music. It commenced in 1987.

! 
|-
| 1993
| Bernie McGann Trio 
| rowspan="6"| Best Jazz Album
| 
| rowspan="6"| 
|-
| 1995
| McGann McGann 
| 
|-
| 1997
| Playground 
| 
|-
| 2001
| Bundeena 
| 
|-
| 2006
| Always 
| 
|-
| 2012
| Wending
| 
|-

Australian Jazz Bell Awards
The Australian Jazz Bell Awards, (also known as the Bell Awards or The Bells), are annual music awards for the jazz music genre in Australia. They commenced in 2003.

|-
| 2008
| Bernie McGann
| Hall of Fame
| 
|-

Don Banks Music Award
The Don Banks Music Award was established in 1984 to publicly honour a senior artist of high distinction who has made an outstanding and sustained contribution to music in Australia. It was founded by the Australia Council in honour of Don Banks, Australian composer, performer and the first chair of its music board.

|-
| 1998
| Bernie McGann
| Don Banks Music Award
| 
|-

Mo Awards
The Australian Entertainment Mo Awards (commonly known informally as the Mo Awards), were annual Australian entertainment industry awards. They recognise achievements in live entertainment in Australia from 1975 to 2016. Bernie McGann won three awards in that time.
 (wins only)
|-
| 1992
| Bernie McGann Trio
| Jazz Group of the Year
| 
|-
| 1994
| Bernie McGann
| Jazz Instrumental Performer of the Year
| 
|-
| 1997
| Bernie McGann Trio
| Jazz Group of the Year
| 
|-

References 

1937 births
2013 deaths
ARIA Award winners
Australian jazz saxophonists
Male saxophonists
Jazz alto saxophonists
Musicians from New South Wales
20th-century Australian musicians
20th-century saxophonists
20th-century Australian male musicians
Male jazz musicians
The Last Straw (band) members
Emanem Records artists